Douglas William Piatt (born September 26, 1965) is an American former Major League Baseball pitcher. Despite putting up an impressive 2.60 earned run average and striking out 29 batters in 34 innings, Piatt never received another chance in the major leagues. He continued to pitch in the minor leagues until , finishing his career with the independent Waterbury Spirit.

Sources

1965 births
Living people
Abilene Prairie Dogs players
American expatriate baseball players in Canada
Baseball players from Pennsylvania
Beaumont Bullfrogs players
Buffalo Bisons (minor league) players
Burlington Indians players (1986–2006)
Carolina Mudcats players
Gulf Coast State Commodores baseball players
Harrisburg Senators players
Indianapolis Indians players
Jacksonville Expos players
Kinston Indians players
Major League Baseball pitchers
Memphis Chicks players
Montreal Expos players
People from Beaver, Pennsylvania
Phoenix Firebirds players
Rio Grande Valley White Wings players
Rockford Expos players
Waterbury Spirit players
Waterloo Indians players
Watertown Indians players
West Palm Beach Expos players
Western Kentucky Hilltoppers baseball players